Riverton High School (abbreviated "Riverton" or "RHS") is a public high school with a 52-acre (210,000 m2) campus located in the city of Riverton, Utah in the southwest corner of the Salt Lake Valley. It is one of eight high schools in the Jordan School District and as of 2013 served about 2,027 students from parts of Riverton and parts of nearby Bluffdale.

History 
Riverton High School was proposed in the late 1990s as a necessary measure to relieve the overpopulation of schools in the rapidly growing southwest area of the Jordan School District. Once it was completed it would do so by taking in students from the cities of Riverton, Herriman, and Bluffdale: an area which at the time was mostly covered by the overwhelmed Bingham High School.

In 1997 the building contract for the school was awarded to Union Pointe Construction Corp. and construction began. The school was constructed according to the Jordan School District's policy of basing the design of all high schools on a single, ever-developing model, and as such is architecturally similar to many other high schools in the surrounding area such as Jordan, Copper Hills, Timpanogos, Lone Peak, and Herriman. The first year of school was the year of 1999–2000, during which some of its components were still being completed.

The student population in the area has continued to increase at a fast pace, and by 2009 Riverton High School was the largest school in the state of Utah. Accordingly, in 2010 students from Herriman and parts of western Riverton began to attend the newly constructed Herriman High School, which is currently Riverton's unofficial rival.

Silver Rush 
Silver Rush started during Riverton High's first operating school year in 1999-2000 as a winter charity drive similar to that of other schools in the area; fundraising efforts took place entirely within the school, and a reward assembly for students was held at the end of the drive.

During the next school year the focus of the drive shifted and expanded to focus more on the charity for which the money was being raised and on fundraising in local neighborhoods in addition to the school itself. Many of the fundraising activities begun during the 2000–2001 school year have become traditions that continue as a part of the drive today, including door-to-door “odd jobs” in exchange for donations and a date auction of the Student Body Officers.  In 2016, Student Body President Adam Murray was auctioned for a record $2000.

One of the most unique things about Silver Rush is that the Riverton Student Body Officers choose a different charity every single year. They go into a multi-month process of deciding which charity to choose by interviewing representatives from those charities. In recent years they have raised money for International Rescue Committee (IRC), ShelterKids, Now I Can, South Valley Services, Millie's Princess Foundation, Mitchell's Journey, Intermountain Healing Hearts, Olive Osmond Hearing fund, Haley Bell Blessed Chair Foundation, and many others. The student body and community do their best to make sure that "it's not about the money, it's about the change".

As Silver Rush has expanded, other fundraising events supporting the drive have been held, including a yearly Battle of the Bands competition, Mr. Silver Rush (a male beauty pageant), community auctions, charitable donations from the proceeds of product fundraisers held by local businesses, and benefit concerts, including several featuring Jon Schmidt, one featuring Collin Raye, and one featuring Alex Boyé and David Osmond.

In December 2015, Silver Rush raised over approximately $130,000 for Mitchell's Journey.

In December 2016, Silver Rush raised over approximately $191,000 for Millie's Princess Foundation. Since 1999, Silver Rush has raised a total of over a million dollars as of December 2016.

In December 2017, Silver Rush raised over approximately $178,000 for the Now I Can Foundation.

In December 2018, Silver Rush raised over approximately $210,000 for Shelter Kids.

In December 2019, Silver Rush raised approximately $176,076 for South Valley Services.

In December 2020, Silver Rush raised approximately $90,100 for Bear O’ Care during the COVID-19 pandemic.

In December 2022, Silver Rush raised approximately $262,229 for the Children's Justice Center, which currently stands as the most money raised by Riverton High School's Silver Rush to date.

School Athletics 

Riverton High School has a highly acclaimed athletics department that includes the following sports.

Football
Basketball
Cross Country
Golf
Soccer
Softball
Swim
Tennis
Track
Volleyball
Wrestling
Baseball
Marching Band

Test Scores

American College Test (ACT) 
The ACT includes testing in the areas of Math, Science, Reading and English. Scale scores range from 1 (low) to 36 (high) for each of the four tests and for the Composite. The Composite score is the average of the four test scores, rounded to the nearest whole number.

Advanced Placement Test (AP) 
Advanced Placement classes are college-level classes offered at the high school campus. Advanced Placement is a national program administered by the College Board. Many colleges and universities around the nation award credit based on scores from the AP Exams.

Notes

References

External links

The Official Riverton High School Website
Official Jordan School District webpage for Riverton High.
Official Utah education website with school information.
Info about RHS Student Progress
RHS Test scores vs. National Average.

Public high schools in Utah
Educational institutions established in 1999
Schools in Salt Lake County, Utah
1999 establishments in Utah
Riverton, Utah